Towering Inferno is an Atari 2600 game designed by Jeff Corsiglia and programmed by Paul Allen Newell and released by US Games in 1982. The player controls a fireman going through a burning skyscraper to save victims and put out the fires. The game was produced under a licence obtained from 20th Century Fox by Quaker Oats, the parent company of US Games, for the video game rights to the movie of the same name.

Newell also programmed Entombed for the 2600 and the Vectrex port of Scramble.

Gameplay

On each floor of the building, the player must put out the flames and reach the panel that opens the doors to get back out. While doing so, there is a meter at the top showing how many people are on that floor. The longer it takes a player to open the doors and get out, the more the meter decreases. The object is to work as fast as you can while avoiding and putting out flames to open the doors and escape with the most people remaining on the meter. The game can be played by one or two players.

Reception
Towering Inferno was reviewed in Video magazine in its "Arcade Alley" column where it was described as "an above-average, enjoyable cartridge [that] is a refreshing change from shoot-shoot-shoot". Reviewers emphasized the non-violent nature of the game, noting that it "achieves a respectable level of excitement without having a shot fired in anger", however they also cautioned readers that the game "may be a little too patterned and repetitive for some". Videogaming Illustrated described the game as "fast-paced entertainment" and listed it as "highly recommended".

Later reviewers were less forgiving of the graphics but praised the gameplay. In Classic Home Video Games, 1972-1984: A Complete Reference Guide, Brett Weiss describes the graphics as "cheap looking" but describes the gameplay as "original and even compelling".

Reviews
Games

See also
Fire Fighter, another Atari 2600 fire fighting game from 1982

References

External links
Towering Inferno at Atari Mania
Towering Inferno at AtariAge

1982 video games
Action video games
Atari 2600 games
Atari 2600-only games
North America-exclusive video games
Video games about firefighting
Video games based on films
Video games developed in the United States
Video games set in 1974
Video games set in San Francisco
U.S. Games games